The red-eyed bent-toed gecko (Cyrtodactylus erythrops)  is a species of gecko that is endemic to southern Thailand.

References 

Cyrtodactylus
Reptiles described in 2009